Epigenetics is a monthly peer-reviewed scientific journal covering research pertaining to epigenetics. It was established in 2006 and published by Landes Bioscience, until this company was acquired by Taylor & Francis in 2014. It is the official journal of the Epigenetics Society (formerly the DNA Methylation Society). The editor-in-chief is Manel Esteller (University of Barcelona).

Abstracting and indexing 
The journal is abstracted and indexed in:

According to the Journal Citation Reports, the journal has a 2017 impact factor of 4.918, ranking it 51st out of 292 journals in the category "Biochemistry & Molecular Biology" and 30th out of 171 in the category "Genetics & Heredity".

References

External links 
 

Epigenetics
Genetics journals
Taylor & Francis academic journals
Publications established in 2006
Monthly journals
English-language journals